The Narrow Road may refer to:

The Narrow Road (1912 film), American short silent film
The Narrow Road (2022 film), Hong Kong film